The Shepp–Logan phantom is a standard test image created by Larry Shepp and Benjamin F. Logan for their 1974 paper The Fourier Reconstruction of a Head Section.  It serves as the model of a human head in the development and testing of image reconstruction algorithms.

Definition 
The function describing the phantom is defined as the sum of 10 ellipses inside a 2×2 square:

References

See also
Imaging phantom

Image processing
1974 works
Test items